Mongolicosa glupovi is a species of wolf spider found in the Russian republics of Altai, Khakassia and Tuva.

This is a dark-coloured spider up to 9.2 mm in length. The male is darker than the female, with the tibia and tarsus paler than the rest of the leg. In females it is the coxa and patella which are slightly paler. (See arthropod leg#Chelicerata for details).

References

Lycosidae
Spiders described in 2003
Spiders of Russia